Fadouwa Ledhem (born 28 September 1987) is a French long-distance runner. In 2018, she competed in the women's half marathon at the 2018 IAAF World Half Marathon Championships held in Valencia, Spain and she finished in 102nd place. She also competed in the women's half marathon at the 2018 Mediterranean Games held in Tarragona, Spain. She finished in 6th place.

In 2018, she won the French Half Marathon Championships held in Saint-Omer, France.

In 2019, she competed in the women's event at the 2019 European 10,000m Cup held in London, United Kingdom.

References

External links 
 

Living people
1987 births
Place of birth missing (living people)
French female long-distance runners
Athletes (track and field) at the 2018 Mediterranean Games
Mediterranean Games competitors for France
21st-century French women